Abrotanella pusilla is a member of the daisy family and is endemic species of New Zealand.

References

Taxa named by Joseph Dalton Hooker
pusilla